The Church of Jesus Christ of Latter-day Saints (LDS Church) has had a presence in Mexico since 1874. Mexico has the largest body of LDS Church members outside of the United States. Membership grew nearly 30% between 2011 to 2021. In the 2010 Mexican census, 314,932 individuals self-identified most closely to the LDS Church.

History

Early missionary efforts 

The first missionaries from the LDS Church to Mexico were called during the late summer and early fall of 1875, shortly after Daniel W. Jones and Meliton Gonzalez Trejo had begun to translate portions of the Book of Mormon into Spanish. This initial scouting mission consisted of a handful of men who journeyed through Arizona to the Mexican state of Chihuahua, lasting ten months. These first missionaries did not perform any baptisms; church president Brigham Young had instructed them to merely observe the conditions of the country in order to determine if their preaching would be effective.

In 1876, Young sent six missionaries to Mexico and instructed them to contact and preach to the Yaqui in Northern Mexico. This group consisted of Helaman Pratt, Meliton Gonzalez Trejo, Louis Garff, George Terry, James Z. Stewart, and his brother Isaac. A few of these missionaries found success in Hermosillo, and Jose Epifanio Jesus was baptized on May 20, 1877, becoming the first official member of the church in Mexico. Jose Severo Rodriguez, Maria de la Cruz Pasos, Cruz Parra, and Jose Vicente Parra were all baptized a few days later on May 24.

Following the death of Brigham Young in 1877, missionary efforts in Mexico were halted, until in 1879 when missionaries were again sent to Mexico City.  The first person baptized by missionaries in Mexico City was Dr. Plotino Rhodakanaty, a prominent Mexican anarchist and socialist figure. Rhodakanaty had come across a Mormon doctrinal tract in 1875 which so impressed him that he wrote a letter to the First Presidency, requesting that additional materials and missionaries be sent to him in Mexico City. By the end of 1879, sixteen converts had been baptized and joined the church in Mexico City, in large part due to the influence of Dr. Rhodakanaty. In 1880, Desideria Quintanar de Yáñez became the first woman in Mexico City to join the church. Missionary work in central Mexico continued until 1889, when all missionaries were withdrawn due to the strong opposition to foreign ministers following La Reforma.

Re-establishment of the church 
In 1901, the Mexican Mission of the church was re-established, with Ammon M. Tenney serving as its president. This period of the church in Mexico was characterized by the calling of missionaries with highly developed Spanish language skills, the increasing indigenous leadership of branches, and the constant effort to reclaim members that had fallen away during the church's absence. In 1910, Rey L. Pratt became president of the mission, but was forced to leave Mexico City in the fall of 1913 due to rising safety concerns due to the Mexican Revolution. Before his departure, Pratt was able to leave most of the branches in Central Mexico under the leadership of local members.

During the Mexican Revolution, tensions rose with regards to foreign religions, as did anti-American sentiments. In 1915, two members of the church in San Marcos, Hidalgo named Rafael Monroy and Vicente Morales were killed by the Liberation Army of the South (Zapatistas) for refusing to renounce their faith and for their association with foreigners. The two were taken and interrogated by a group of Zapatista soldiers, who had initially demanded food and other supplies from the Monroy family store. Monroy was asked by the soldiers to show his weapons, to which he responded by holding up the copies of the Bible and Book of Mormon he carried in his pocket and saying, "These are the only weapons I carry." After the store was searched and no weapons or ammunition were found, Monroy and Morales, an employee of the family, were both taken prisoner by the soldiers and later executed by firing squad.

Pratt remained as mission president until his death, also working to establish missionary work among the Spanish-speaking populations in the Southwestern United States. In 1926, the Mexican government deported all foreign clerics from the country, including Mormon missionaries from North America. This lasted until 1934, when foreign missionary efforts were able to resume. During this hiatus, Mexican members of the church were able to coordinate with one another and preserve the church doctrine and practices.
  
In 1936, a group of church members known as the Third Convention—who had been influenced by the spirit of the Mexican Revolution—called for a native-born Mexican to serve as president of the church's mission in Mexico. The tactics of this group led to the excommunication of its leaders. In 1946, church president George Albert Smith visited Mexico and was able to establish a reconciliation with most of the members of the Third Convention, and the vast majority of this group were brought back into the church.

In 1956, the Mexican Mission was divided for the first time with the organization of the Northern Mexican Mission. From this time forward, the church focused on strengthening the structure of the church in order for stakes to be organized.

1960 to present 
Church membership began to expand rapidly during the late 1960s, reaching 100,000 members by 1972. As membership increased, church leaders began making regular visits to church members in Mexico. In 1972, church president Harold B. Lee spoke to members at a Mexico City area conference, along with his counselors, several Apostles, and other leaders. In early 1977, church president Spencer W. Kimball spoke to a large number of church members at area conferences in both Mexico City and Monterrey, with nearly 25,000 members attending the conference in Mexico City. During his visit, Kimball also met with Mexican President Jose Lopez Portillo at the national palace in Mexico City.

The first Spanish-speaking stake in the church was organized in Mexico City in 1961. In 1966, Agricol Lozano became the first Mexican-born member of the church to serve as a stake president. In 1970, the Monterrey Stake (now the Monterrey Mexico Mitras Stake) was organized with Guillermo G. Garza as its president. This was the first stake organized in Mexico outside of the Mormon colonies and the Mexico City area.

On December 2, 1983, the Mexico City Temple and Visitors’ Center were dedicated by Gordon B. Hinckley, marking the first temple in Mexico.

Church education in Mexico 
A movement began in the mid-20th century which focused on the organization of a church school system in Mexico. The movement was initiated by Claudio Bowsan, the president of the Mexican Mission at the time. Bowsan bought property in Churhbusco, Mexico City and established a committee—composed of Marion G. Romney, Joseph T. Bentley, and Bowsan himself—to establish schools in Mexico. With the help and approval of the First Presidency of the church, a private high school was founded on the land purchased by Bowsan in 1964 known as the Centro Escolar Benemérito de las Américas (commonly known as the "Benemérito"). At its founding, the school had 125 students and contained primary, secondary, and preparatory-level classes. It eventually became a large preparatory school, accommodating day students as well as boarding students. At its peak, there were more than 2,100 students in attendance. It was closed at the end of the 2012-2013 school year, and its campus was converted into a missionary training center.

Another church-established school in Mexico is the Academia Juárez, which was first established as the Juárez Stake Academy in September 1897 with 291 students. Located within the church's Colonia Juárez in Chihuahua, the school was similar to academies found in the Utah territory, and provided English-language instruction intended for "an Anglo population". The school was not closed when other academies were closed in the 1920s and 1930s, likely because public school education in Mexico during the Mexican Revolution was inadequate. Settlers from Utah Territory remained isolated and aloof from native Mexicans, celebrating American holidays and teaching in English. Moises de la Pena, a Mexican academic, declared that the school was an "illegal privilege" in 1950. The school is still in operation, with 418 students as of the 2012-2013 school year, and approximately 80% of the students are members of the church. The school now utilizes a unique dual-language program beginning in kindergarten and continuing through high school.

Mormon colonies 
In 1885, a group of Latter-day Saints from the Utah and Arizona territories fleeing the U.S. federal government's prosecution of Mormon polygamists settled in the Mexican state of Chihuahua. These Latter-day Saints eventually founded the settlements of Colonia Juárez and Colonia Dublán, along with four others in Chihuahua and two in the state of Sonora. Most of the remaining Mormon colonists in the north of Mexico left the country in 1912 due to rising violence, but many were able to return in later years. In 1959, the church established a network of schools outside of Colonia Juárez. The Academia Juárez is located within the Colonia Juárez in Chihuahua.

Missions
The Benemérito de las Americas school in Mexico City was permanently closed at the end of the 2012–2013 term, and its campus became the new home of the Mexico City Missionary Training Center (MTC), opening on June 26, 2013. This greatly expanded the capacity of the Mexico City MTC, which is now second in size only to the missionary training center in Provo, Utah. The old training center campus near the Mexico City Mexico Temple could only accommodate 125 missionaries at a time, while the new 90-acre campus can handle over 1,000.

The following is a list of missions in Mexico:

  Formerly the Mexico Leon Mission, renamed in July 2013.

Temples

The Mexico City Mexico Temple was the first LDS Church temple in Mexico; it was dedicated in 1983 and rededicated after renovation in 2008. From 1999 to 2002, an additional 11 temples were dedicated in Mexico. This comes after June 29, 1993, when the Mexican government formally registered the LDS Church, allowing it to own property. There are 13 temples in Mexico, with an additional ten announced or under construction.

20th century

21st century

Under Construction

Announced

Significant members from Mexico
 Margarito Bautista, a genealogical missionary from San Miguel de Atlautla, Mexico State and the first branch president of the Temporary Lamanite Branch (later Lucero Ward) in Salt Lake City, Utah.
Rafael Monroy, who became a martyr of the church in 1915.
Benjamin de Hoyos, a General Authority Seventy from Monterrey, Nuevo Leon.
Agricol Lozano, the first Latino stake president in Mexico and a president of the Mexico City Mexico Temple from Tula, Hidalgo.
Carl B. Pratt, a General Authority Seventy born in Monterrey, Mexico.
 Octaviano Tenorio, a General Authority Seventy from Tilapan, Veracruz.

See also 

 Mexicans of American descent
 Mormon colonies in Mexico
 Mormon Corridor
 Religion in Mexico
 The Church of Jesus Christ of Latter-day Saints membership statistics

References

Further reading
Bridgemon, Rondal R. "Mennonites and Mormons in Northern Chihuahua, Mexico." Journal of the Southwest 54.1 (2012): 71–77.
Dormady, Jason H., and Jared M. Tamez, eds. Just South of Zion: The Mormons in Mexico and Its Borderlands. University of New Mexico Press, 2015.
Hardy, B. Carmon. "The trek south: How the Mormons went to Mexico." The Southwestern Historical Quarterly 73.1 (1969): 1-16.
Hardy, B. Carmon. "Cultural" Encystment" as a Cause of the Mormon Exodus from Mexico in 1912." Pacific Historical Review 34.4 (1965): 439-454.
Janzen, Rebecca. Liminal Sovereignty: Mennonites and Mormons in Mexican Culture. SUNY Press, 2018.
Knowlton, David Clark. "How many members are there really? Two censuses and the meaning of LDS membership in Chile and Mexico." Dialogue: A journal of Mormon thought 38.2 (2005): 53.
Naylor, Thomas H. "The Mormons Colonize Sonora: Early Trials at Colonia Oaxaca." Arizona and the West 20.4 (1978): 325–342.
Sally Johnson Odekirk, "Mexico Unfurled: From Struggle to Strength", Liahona, January 2014
2009 Deseret Morning News Church Almanac (Salt Lake City, Utah: Deseret Morning News, 2008) pp. 413–419
F. LaMond Tullis. Mormons in Mexico: The Dynamics of Faith and Culture. (Provo: Museo de Historia del Mormonismo en Mexico A. C., 1997)
F. LaMond Tullis. "Mexico" in Arnold K. Garr, et al., ed. The Encyclopedia of Latter-day Saint History. (Salt Lake City: Deseret Book, 2000) pp. 741–743.
Tullis, LaMond. "Tzotzil-Speaking Mormon Maya in Chiapas, Mexico." Journal of Mormon History 43.2 (2017): 189–216.
.
.

External links
 Newsroom (Mexico) - Facts and Statistics
 LDS Newsroom (Mexico) - News and Information
 The Church of Jesus Christ of Latter-day Saints - Official Site for Mexico (Español)
 ComeUntoChrist.org Latter-day Saints Visitor site

 
Harold B. Lee Library-related Americana articles